Melanodrymia galeronae is a species of sea snail, a marine gastropod mollusk in the family Melanodrymiidae.

Description
The length of the shell attains 3 mm. It is spirallic in shape.

Distribution
This marine species occurs on the East Pacific Rise.

References

Melanodrymiidae
Gastropods described in 2001